Olivas is a surname. Notable people with the surname include:

Alfredo Olivas (born 1994), ranchera, Norteña, Corrido singer/songwriter and accordion player
Daniel Olivas (born 1959), United States author and attorney
Elvira Olivas (born 1935), Mexican politician from the Institutional Revolutionary Party
Francisco José Olivas (born 1988), known as Kiko, Spanish professional footballer
John D. Olivas (born 1965), American engineer and a former NASA astronaut
José Luis Olivas (born 1952), Spanish politician of the People's Party
Ramón Otoniel Olivas (born 1968), retired Nicaraguan footballer and currently football manager
Sal Olivas (born 1946), American football player

See also
Olivas Adobe in Ventura, California, an adobe structure built in 1841 by Raymundo Olivas
Fidel Olivas Escudero District, one of eight districts of the province Mariscal Luzuriaga in Peru
Camp Olivas, regional headquarters of the Philippine National Police (PNP) in Region 3: Central Luzon
Cinco Olivas, municipality located in the province of Zaragoza, Aragon, Spain
Oliva
Olivais (disambiguation)
Olivares (disambiguation)
Olivarius